The Ministry of International Cooperation is a ministry of Myanmar. It is one of the two foreign affairs ministries of Myanmar. The ministry is currently led by union minister Ko Ko Hlaing who is appointed by SAC Chairman Min Aung Hlaing.

Formation 
Htun Htun Oo, Union Attorney General, posted a bill from the president to the Pyidaungsu Hluttaw for the formation of two new ministries on 20 November 2017. Attorney General said Myanmar is actively involved in international affairs. In doing so, the new Union Ministry was formed to cooperate with the Ministry of Foreign Affairs in international relations and to have a ministry that would be accountable to the President from a political and economic perspective on international affairs. The union minister of Foreign Affairs Aung San Suu Kyi also holds the post, the State Sounsellor, and can't attend to some foreign ministers meetings. The newly formed minister will attend to foreign ministers meetings on behalf of Foreign Minister. Pyidaungsu Hluttaw approved the formation and the president office formed the new ministry on 24 November 2017.

The ministry was formed by the staff of the International Organizations and Economic Department of the Ministry of Foreign Affairs. The minister office is even located at Office No (9), the Ministry of Foreign Affairs.

Departments
Union Minister Office

List of union ministers

References 

InternationalCooperation
Ministries established in 2017
2017 establishments in Myanmar
Myanmar
Foreign relations of Myanmar